Mean is the fifth and final album by American hard rock band Montrose, released in 1987. It has much more of a glam metal sound than previous Montrose albums.  It was the lowest-charting release on Montrose's career, reaching No. 165 on the Billboard 200 in June 1987.

According to Ronnie Montrose, singer Johnny Edwards and drummer James Kottak were still officially in the band Buster Brown at the time of the recording of Mean. They later played together in the first line-up of the band Wild Horses.

Guitarist Ronnie Montrose and bassist Glenn Letsch played together in the band Gamma both before, and after, this album.

It featured the song "M for Machine" which was written as a potential song for the 1987 American cyberpunk action film  RoboCop, directed by Paul Verhoeven.

Drummer James Kottak went on to join the original line-up of hard rock/glam metal band Kingdom Come, remaining with that band during their most commercially successful period, prior to reconnecting with Edwards in Wild Horses. He would later rejoin renown hard rock band Scorpions in 1996, remaining with the group until his eventual firing in 2016, reportedly due to his struggle with alcoholism. After leaving Wild Horses, Edwards became the frontman for Foreigner on their 1991 album, Unusual Heat.

Track listing
 "Don't Damage the Rock" (Ronnie Montrose) – 5:06
 "Game of Love" (Clint Ballard Jr. / Wayne Fontana and The Mindbenders cover) – 2:57
 "Pass It On" (Montrose, Johnny Edwards, James Kottak) – 3:37
 "Hard Headed Woman" (Montrose) – 3:50
 "M for Machine" (Montrose) – (3:59)
 "Ready, Willing, and Able" (Montrose) – 4:19
 "Man of the Hour" (Montrose) – 4:23
 "Flesh and Blood" (Montrose, Edwards, Kottak) – 4:36
 "Stand" (Montrose) – 4:46

Personnel
 Johnny Edwards – vocals
 Ronnie Montrose – guitars, producer
 Glenn Letsch – bass guitar
 James Kottak – drums

Production
 Roger Wiersema – engineer
 John Francombe – additional engineering
 Eddy Schreyer – mastering at Capitol Studios
 Marc Bonilla - cover design

References

Other sources
 Montrose; "Mean" liner notes; Enigma Records 1987

Montrose (band) albums
1987 albums
Enigma Records albums